Heorhiy Kopaliani (born 7 March 1994) is a professional Ukrainian football goalkeeper who played for the amateur club FC Juniors Shpytky.

Kopaliani is a product of FC Arsenal.

Made his debut for FC Arsenal in a game against FC Shakhtar Donetsk on 5 October 2013 in the Ukrainian Premier League.

References

External links

1994 births
Living people
Ukrainian footballers
FC Arsenal Kyiv players
FC Poltava players
Ukrainian Premier League players
Association football goalkeepers
Footballers from Kyiv